Mind of Mencia is an American comedy television series on the cable channel Comedy Central. Hosted by comedian Carlos Mencia, it aired from July 6, 2005 to July 23, 2008.

History 
The first season of Mind of Mencia ran from July 6, 2005 to September 28, 2005, premiering on Comedy Central with an initial order of ten episodes. Soon after that the series was renewed for a second season, set to air in winter of 2006. Season 2 premiered on March 22, 2006. The first season was released on DVD on March 21, 2006 to coincide with the premiere. The second season became Comedy Central's ninth highest rated program.

In a May 2006 Wall Street Journal article, Mencia said he initially resisted requests by his network to take a deal to do a stand-up comedy album on the Comedy Central label, but will now likely appear on one.

The series ended in 2008 after four seasons when Mencia decided against filming a fifth season.

Cast members 
 Carlos Mencia
 Joseph Mencia
 Brad Williams
 Ray Payton

Guest appearances

 James Adomian
 Dave Attell
 Robin Bain
 Josh Blue
 Peter Boyle
 Sufe Bradshaw
 Frank Caliendo
 Edge
 Pablo Francisco
 Joey Greco
 Chris Hansen
 Estelle Harris
 Tony Hawk
 Gabriel Iglesias
 Courtney Jackson
 Ken Jeong
 Jamie Kennedy
 Angela Kinsey
 Phil LaMarr
 Bobby Lee
 Mario Lopez
 Method Man
 Cheech Marin
 Tracy Morgan
 Abigail Mason
 Amaury Nolasco
 Lupe Ontiveros
 P.O.D.
 Smush Parker
 Jeff Richards
 Gene Simmons
 Aries Spears
 Three 6 Mafia
 Daniel Tosh
 Tom Virtue
 Billy Dee Williams
 Robin Williams
 Debra Wilson
 John Witherspoon

Recurring characters and sketches

Stereotype Olympics
In season two they put stereotypes to the test. Few of the stereotypes stood up to the test.

Punji
Punji is a Hindu storekeeper who insults customers with obvious physical and/or social problems, before telling them to "get the park out of my store". He often expresses the wish to be reincarnated as something the person is not likely to ever see/use (for example, he says "I hope I am reincarnated as your feet, so you will never see me again" to an obese woman). Before going on his tirades, he begs for forgiveness from various Hindu gods such as Shiva and Vishnu. Punji has been a storekeeper at "Heaven-11", a store that sells wives, and an electrical store.

Carlosaurus Rex
Carlosaurus Rex is a call-in kid's show that deals with serious/mature matters. The show is a parody of Barney & Friends and was originally hijacked from a Barney-like character, Larry the Lizard. Examples of the mature matters the show deals with include: 
 A kid telephones the show, saying that his parents sent their dog "to live on a farm" (a euphemism parents use to explain the death of a family pet). Carlosaurus sings him a song explaining that the kid's dad shot the dog and dumped the body into a river. 
 A boy calls, saying that "all my other friends like girls, but I think I like boys!". Carlosaurus sings him a song, "If you think you might be gay then you're gay!" (to the tune of "If You're Happy and You Know It"), whereupon the boy is then heard saying, 'Hey, Mom, I'm gay!". 
 A kid asks if touching himself when he wakes up is wrong. Carlosaurus sings him a song to the tune of "Rock-a-bye Baby":
Rock-a-bye, Billy,Time for sleep!You've washed your face,You've brushed your teeth.Now grab some lotion and that crunchy sock.Think of Jessica Alba while stroking your--'' "...Listen kids I'm trying to tell you!"

Judge Carlos
Carlos plays a judge, and with the help of the ghost of Johnnie Cochran looks at real life recent court cases.

The Adventures of Carlitos
An animated cartoon based on Carlos' life as a kid.

DVD releases
Each DVD set includes uncensored versions of each season's episodes with bonus features including commentary, a behind the scenes featurette, and deleted scenes.

References

External links

 

2005 American television series debuts
2008 American television series endings
2000s American sketch comedy television series
American television series with live action and animation
American television shows featuring puppetry
Comedy Central original programming
English-language television shows
Latino sitcoms